Stigmatolaelaps is a genus of mites in the family Laelapidae.

Species
 Stigmatolaelaps greeni (Oudemans, 1902)     
 Stigmatolaelaps hunteri Krantz, 1998     
 Stigmatolaelaps sumatrensis Krantz, 1998

References

Laelapidae